Young America's Foundation (YAF) is a conservative youth organization founded in 1969. In 2018, the Los Angeles Times called YAF "one of the most preeminent, influential and controversial forces in the nation's conservative youth movement." Scott Walker, former governor of Wisconsin and 2016 Republican presidential candidate, became President of YAF on February 1, 2021.

Notable alumni members include Jeff Sessions and Stephen Miller.

History
Young America's Foundation was founded in 1969 at Vanderbilt University when students formed an organization called University Information Services (UIS). UIS was established to provide students with a familial atmosphere to express their conservative beliefs. When UIS became a national organization in the early 1970s, it changed its name to Young America's Foundation. Young America's Foundation held the first National Conservative Student Conference in 1979.  It is a co-founder of the annual Conservative Political Action Conference and has been a prominent supporter of the event since then.

In 1998 it purchased the Reagan Ranch, "Rancho del Cielo", near Santa Barbara, California, with the help of a $10 million endowment from Amway billionaires Richard and Helen DeVos. Donations, including $200,000 from orthodontist Dr Robert Ruhe, allowed YAF redeem the mortgage on the Reagan Ranch early. YAF president Ron Robinson said YAF's goal was to preserve both Reagan's legacy and the ranch itself and that it would maintain the facilities as they existed when the Reagans lived there.

According to Time magazine, by 2004, there were no left-wing youth organizations as powerful as The Young America's Foundation (YAF), The Intercollegiate Studies Institute (ISI) and The Leadership Institute. The Time article noted that in surveys of incoming college students by the American Council on Education, a "majority of 2003 freshmen – 53% – wanted affirmative action abolished, compared with only 43% of all adults. Two-thirds of frosh favored abortion rights in 1992; only 55% did so in last year's survey. Support for gun control has slipped in recent years among the young, and last year 53% of students believed that 'wealthy people should pay a larger share of taxes than they do now,' compared with 72% 11 years earlier". The New York Times cited more polling in 2005 to describe American college students' "renewed shift pronouncedly to the right on many defining issues", a movement it said was "fueled and often financed by an array of conservative interest groups" including Americans for Freedom, Young America's Foundation, the Leadership Institute, the Collegiate Network, and the Intercollegiate Studies Institute. 

By 2017, YAF had 250 high school and college affiliates known as Young Americans for Freedom, which was originally a separate organization.

In July 2019, it was announced that former Governor of Wisconsin Scott Walker would become YAF's president in 2021.

In November 2019, YAF cut ties with a long-time featured speaker, Michelle Malkin, who voiced her support for alt-right journalist, Nick Fuentes.

YAF's stated mission is "ensuring that increasing numbers of young Americans understand and are inspired by the ideas of individual freedom, a strong national defense, free enterprise, and traditional values."

Programs
Young America's Foundation is a tax-exempt educational foundation. The Foundation's programs include lectures on college and high school campuses, conferences throughout the United States, and campus activism initiatives. These programs are broadcast on C-SPAN. Young America's Foundation also preserves the Ronald Reagan Ranch and his Boyhood Home, runs the  National Journalism Center (NJC), and oversees Young Americans for Freedom.

The National Journalism Center
The National Journalism Center which was founded in 1977 by M. Stanton Evans, is currently a project of Young America's Foundation that places college students and recent graduates at media organizations in the Washington, D.C. area. Notable alumni include Ann Coulter, Tim Carney, and Malcolm Gladwell.

Young Americans for Freedom 

On March 16, 2011, Young Americans for Freedom (YAF) passed a National Board Resolution which resulted in the merger of two organizations into the Young America's Foundation on April 1, 2011. YAF was founded on September 11, 1960, at the family home of William F. Buckley in Sharon, Connecticut. The charter for the Young Americans for Freedom, written by M. Stanton Evans, the Sharon Statement,was described by K.E.Grubbs in 2010 as "the late 20th century's single most elegant distillation of conservative principles". The Heritage Foundation described the Sharon Statement as "a succinct summary of the central ideas of modern American conservatism".

Funding

Donors include Pat Sajak and Amway billionaires Richard and Helen DeVos. Robert Ruhe (1929–2013), an orthodontist in California, was the single largest donor of the YAF, with his legacy estate gift of $16 million. This resulted in a doubling of YAF's programming, which includes campus speeches. During his lifetime he and his wife donated generously to YAF, particularly in terms of paying off the mortgage of the Reagan Ranch.

Criticism
Many of the organization's speakers, for example Robert B. Spencer, have been criticized for Islamophobic views and speeches.

See also
 State Policy Network: a U.S. national network of free-market oriented think tanks of which Young America's is an associate member

References

Further reading
 Tower, Wells. 2006. "The Kids are Far Right." Harper's Magazine 313, no. 1878: 41–53. Academic Search Premier, EBSCOhost (accessed November 24, 2008).
 Jacobson, J. (2006, January 6). "Conservative Group Cites Colleges of Like Mind". Chronicle of Higher Education, 52(18), A48-A48. Retrieved November 24, 2008, from Academic Search Premier database.

External links
 
 Selected publications at ISSUU
 

Political organizations based in the United States
Organizations established in 1969
Conservative organizations in the United States
Student political organizations in the United States
501(c)(3) organizations
1969 establishments in Tennessee
Political youth organizations in the United States